The Third Anglo-Afghan War began on 6 May 1919 when the Emirate of Afghanistan invaded British India and ended with an armistice on 8 August 1919. The Anglo-Afghan Treaty of 1919 resulted in the Afghans gaining control of foreign affairs from Britain and the British recognizing the Durand Line as the border between Afghanistan and British India. According to British author Michael Barthorp, it was a strategic victory for the British because the Durand Line was reaffirmed as the border between Afghanistan and the British Raj, and the Afghans agreed not to foment trouble on the British side. However, Afghans who were on the British side of the border did cause concerns due to revolts.

Background
The root cause of the Third Anglo-Afghan War took hold long before fighting commenced. For the British in India, Afghanistan was seen as a threat. The British worried about Russian intentions, concerned that an invasion of India could be launched by Tsarist forces through Afghanistan. This period became known as the Great Game. In an effort to negate this threat, the British made numerous attempts at imposing their will upon Kabul, and over the course of the 19th century fought two wars: the First Anglo-Afghan War (1839–1842) and the Second Anglo-Afghan War (1878–1880).

The end of the Second Afghan War in 1880, marked the beginning of almost 40 years of good relations between Britain and Afghanistan, under the leadership of Abdur Rahman Khan and Habibullah Khan, during which time the British attempted to manage Afghan foreign policy through the payment of a large subsidy. While the country ostensibly remained independent, under the Treaty of Gandamak (1879) it accepted that in external matters it would "...have no windows looking on the outside world, except towards India".

In 1901, the death of Emir Abdur Rahman Khan led indirectly to the war that began 18 years later. His successor, Habibullah, was a pragmatic leader who sided with Britain or Russia depending on Afghan interests. Despite considerable resentment over not being consulted on the Anglo-Russian Convention of 1907 (Convention of St. Petersburg), Afghanistan remained neutral during the First World War (1914–1918), resisting considerable pressure from the Ottoman Empire, which entered the conflict on the side of the Central Powers; the Ottoman Sultan (as titular leader of Islam) called for a holy war against the Allies.

Despite remaining neutral in the conflict, Habibullah did in fact accept a Turkish-German mission in Kabul and military assistance from the Central Powers as he attempted to play both sides of the conflict for the best deal. Through continual prevarication, he resisted numerous requests for assistance from the Central Powers, but failed to keep in check troublesome tribal leaders, intent on undermining British rule in India, as Turkish agents attempted to foment trouble along the frontier. The departure of a large part of the British Indian Army to fight overseas and news of British defeats at the hands of the Turks aided Turkish agents in efforts at sedition, and in 1915 there was unrest amongst the Mohmands and then the Mahsuds. Notwithstanding these outbreaks, the frontier generally remained settled at a time when Britain could ill afford trouble.

A Turko-German mission left Kabul in 1916. By that time, however, it had successfully convinced Habibullah that Afghanistan was an independent nation and that it should be beholden to no one. With the end of the First World War, Habibullah sought to obtain rewards from the British government for his assistance during the war. Looking for British recognition of Afghanistan's independence in foreign affairs, he demanded a seat at the Versailles Peace Conference in 1919. This request was denied by the Viceroy, Frederic Thesiger, 1st Viscount Chelmsford, on the grounds that attendance at the conference was confined to the belligerents. Further negotiations were scheduled, but before they could begin Habibullah was assassinated on 19 February 1919.

This resulted in a power struggle as Habibullah's brother Nasrullah Khan proclaimed himself as Habibullah's successor, while in Kabul Amanullah, Habibullah's third son, had also proclaimed himself Amir. The Afghan army suspected Amanullah's complicity in the death of his father. Needing a way of cementing his power, upon seizing the throne in April 1919, Amanullah posed as a supporter of democratic ideals, promising governmental reforms. He stated that there should be no forced labour, tyranny, or oppression, and that Afghanistan should be free and independent and no longer bound by the Treaty of Gandamak.

Amanullah had his uncle Nasrullah arrested and sentenced to life imprisonment for Habibullah's murder. Nasrullah had been the leader of a more conservative element in Afghanistan, and his treatment rendered Amanullah's position as Amir somewhat tenuous. By April 1919, Amanullah realised that if he could not find a way to placate the conservatives, he would be unlikely to maintain his hold on power. Looking for a diversion from the internal strife in the Afghan court and sensing advantage in the rising civil unrest in India following the Amritsar massacre, Amanullah decided to invade British India.

Opposing forces
In 1919, the Afghan regular army was not a very formidable force, and was only able to muster some 50,000 men. These men were organised into 21 cavalry regiments and 75 infantry battalions, with about 280 modern artillery pieces, organised into 70 batteries, in support. In addition to this, however, in a boost to the army's strength, the Afghan command could call upon the loyalty of up to 80,000 frontier tribesmen and an indeterminate number of deserters from local militia units under British command. In reality, the Afghan regular army was not ready for war. As in past years, the upper levels of the officer corps were riddled with political intrigue. In his book on the campaign, Lieutenant-General George Molesworth gave the following evaluation of the Amir's army:

Afghan regular units...were ill-trained, ill-paid, and probably under strength. The cavalry was little better than indifferent infantry mounted on equally indifferent ponies. Rifles varied between modern German, Turkish and British types, to obsolete Martinis and Snyders. Few infantry units had bayonets. Artillery was ponydrawn, or pack, and included modern 10 cm Krupp howitzers, 75 mm Krupp mountain guns and ancient 7 pounder weapons. There were a few, very old, four-barrel Gardiner machine guns. Ammunition was in short supply and distribution must have been very difficult. For the artillery much black powder was used, both as a propellent and bursting charge for shells. The Kabul arsenal workshops were elementary and mainly staffed by Sikh artificers with much ingenuity but little real skill. There was no organised transport and arrangements for supply were rudimentary.

In support of the regulars, the Afghan command expected to call out the tribes, which could gather up to 20,000 or 30,000 Afridi fighters in the Khyber region alone. In stark contrast to the regulars, the tribal lashkars were probably the best troops that the Afghans had, being of excellent fighting quality, well armed, mainly with weapons that they had made themselves or stolen from the garrisons and with plenty of ammunition.

In meeting this threat, the British could call on a much larger force. In May 1919, the British and British Indian Army, not including frontier militia, totalled eight divisions, as well as five independent brigades of infantry and three of cavalry. However, of this force, the entire North-West Frontier Province had three infantry divisions and two cavalry brigades, although there was also GHQ India's central reserve of one infantry division and one cavalry brigade. From this, they formed a striking force of two infantry divisions and two cavalry brigades for offensive operations on the Kyber front with the possibility of using it also in the Tochi and Kurram areas. One infantry division and a so-called "mounted" brigade were also detailed for operations on the Baluchistan–Zhob front. There were also three frontier brigades as well as a number of frontier militia and irregular corps.

Artillery was also in short supply, and the three frontier divisions each had a British field artillery brigade of the Royal Field Artillery with two batteries of 18-pounders and one battery of 4.5-inch howitzers, and an Indian mountain brigade with two batteries of 2.75-inch mountain guns. There were also two batteries of tractor-drawn 6-inch howitzers and two British mountain batteries of the Royal Garrison Artillery, which were reinforced with 3.7-inch mountain howitzers. However, most batteries had only four guns. Finally, there were also 15 pounder guns of the Frontier Garrison Artillery.

Machine guns, at least on the Khyber front, were old .303 Maxims. The British gained a command and control advantage with their use of motor transport and wireless communications, while armored cars and RAF detachments increased their firepower and reach, the latter being demonstrated to the Afghans by a bombing raid on Kabul itself. They could also direct the fire of the 60-pounders. The RAF squadrons involved were No. 31 Squadron and No. 114 Squadron.

The main problem for the British was discontent among their soldiers. The troops in India were no longer as uncritical as they had been when considering what they were being asked to do. Like other units of the British Army, many of the troops considered the war over and looked forward to being demobilised. The Indian Army had been heavily committed to the First World War and had suffered a large number of casualties. Many of its units still had not returned from overseas, and those that had had begun the process of demobilisation. As such, many regiments had lost almost all of their most experienced men. Likewise, the British Army in India had been gutted. Prior to 1914 there had been 61 British regiments serving in India. However, of these, all but ten (two cavalry and eight infantry) had been withdrawn in order to fight in Europe or the Middle East. In their place, units of the Territorial Force (TF), part-time soldiers usually only intended for home defence but who had volunteered for overseas service, had been sent in order to release regular units for the fighting in France. After four years of mundane garrison duty, away from their families and disaffected, most of these men were really only interested in demobilisation and returning to Britain to get on with their lives. They were in no way prepared for a hard-fought campaign on the Indian frontier.

Course of the war
The conflict began on 3 May 1919 when Afghan troops crossed the frontier at the western end of the Khyber Pass and captured the town of Bagh. Bagh was strategically important to the British and Indians as it provided water to Landi Kotal, which was at the time garrisoned by just two companies of troops from the British Indian Army. Although initially considered a minor border infraction, this attack was actually part of the wider invasion plan. For whatever reason the attack had been launched ahead of schedule, however, for Amanullah had intended initially to time it to coincide with an uprising that was being planned in Peshawar for 8 May. This served to alert the British Chief Commissioner of the North West Frontier, Sir George Roos-Keppel, who had become aware of the plan and as a result he was able to successfully convince the Viceroy, Lord Chelmsford, of the need to respond to the occupation of Bagh before it led to further unrest in Peshawar.

In response to this the British Indian government declared war upon Afghanistan on 6 May and ordered a general mobilisation of the British and Indian forces. It was decided next that the two companies of Sikhs and Gurkhas that had been sent to Landi Kotal needed to be reinforced, however, the mobilisation process had only just begun and at that stage there was only one battalion available for this, so on 7 May the 2nd Battalion, Somerset Light Infantry were brought up clandestinely through the Khyber Pass aboard a convoy of 37 lorries.

Meanwhile, a cordon was thrown around Peshawar and demands were made for the population to hand over the uprising's ringleaders. Amid threats that the city's water supply would be cut, the inhabitants complied and by dawn on 8 May the situation in the city was under control and the threat of an uprising abated.

By this stage more reinforcements were available and the garrison at Landi Kotal grew to brigade-size, with the arrival of the rest of the 1st Infantry Brigade under Brigadier G.D. Crocker. On 9 May the British and Indian troops launched an attack on the Afghans that had seized Bagh the previous week. The attack, however, failed when the brigade commander decided to split his forces and detach almost half his force to protect his flank and as a result was unable to achieve the necessary concentration of force to capture all of his objectives. Coinciding with this, three BE2c aircraft from the Royal Air Force carried out a bombing raid on Dacca in Afghanistan, attacking a group of hostile tribesmen.

Following this the 2nd and 3rd Infantry Brigades of the 1st Infantry Division were dispatched from Nowshera and Abbottabad, concentrating at Jamrud and Kacha Garhi. At the same time, the 6th Brigade from the 2nd Infantry Division moved up to Peshawar from Rawalpindi to help quell the unrest there. Two days later, on 11 May, a second attack was made on Bagh by the 1st and 2nd Infantry Brigades, under Major General Fowler, and this time it proved successful. Supported with 22 machine guns and 18 artillery pieces, the attack was preceded by a thirty-minute preparation bombardment before being carried by the 2nd Battalion, North Staffordshire Regiment and two battalions from the 11th Gurkhas, who charged into the Afghan positions with bayonets fixed and drove them into the Lower Khyber, where they were subjected to further indirect fire from mountain guns that had been set up in ambush. As the Afghans were forced back over the border, the RAF followed them across and carried out a number of bombing runs. The rout was total and tribesman that might have otherwise have been expected to counterattack in support of the Afghans decided against doing so, instead turning their efforts to looting the battlefield and gathering the arms and ammunition that the retreating Afghans had left behind. Casualties during the battle, later known as the Second Battle of Bagh, amounted to 100 Afghans killed and 300 wounded, while the British and Indian forces lost eight killed and 31 wounded.

Although Amanullah continued to profess that he had no untoward intentions, Roos-Keppel decided that it was prudent to continue the advance and ordered the army to pursue the Afghans across the border. On 13 May British and Indian troops seized control of the western Khyber without opposition and occupied Dacca, however, the British camp was poorly sited for defence and as a consequence they came under an intense long-range artillery barrage from Afghan artillery before Amanullah launched an infantry assault on them. This assault was defeated and the British launched a counter-attack the following day, however, they were unable to consolidate their position, and as a result it was not until 17 May that the area was secured and the Afghans withdrew.

Meanwhile, the previous day, British and Indian forces had launched an attack on 'Stonehenge Ridge', where an Afghan force of about 3,000 men had established themselves with a number of artillery pieces and machine guns. Under cover of a preliminary bombardment to soften up the Afghan defences, men from the 11th Sikhs had launched the initial assault, however, they were forced to stop their attack when they ran out of ammunition at 08.00 hours, and although a resupply was effected at 10.30 hours, it was not until 14.00 hours that the attack was able to be recommenced. By this time the troops were exposed to the heat of the day; nevertheless, after another barrage was called down, the Sikhs attacked the Afghan line despite the heat and the attack was carried to the top of the ridge. Upon reaching the escarpment they found that the Afghans had left the battlefield, leaving most of their equipment, artillery and a number of standards. During the assault the British and Indian forces lost 22 killed and 157 wounded, while Afghan losses were estimated at around 200 killed and 400 wounded.

At this time, however, trouble struck in the British rear along their line of communications through the Khyber where the Khyber Rifles began to become disaffected by the situation and began to desert en masse. As a result, it was decided to disarm and disband the regiment in an effort to stop the spread of similar sentiment to other regiments. Following this Lord Chelmsford decided that the situation could be resolved by continuing the advance further into Afghanistan and gave the order for the brigade in Dacca to march towards Jalalabad, but this order was unable to be carried out as fighting broke out further to the south and in the eastern Khyber.

As part of the attack on the Khyber, secondary attacks had been planned on Quetta and Kurram, and in the north in Chitral state and in the south in Baluchistan and the Zhob Valley. On 23 May the British posts around the Kurram Valley had to be abandoned. The following day Handley Page bombers attacked Kabul; however, it did little to stem the tide, and the supply situation in Landi Kotal grew worse.

On 27 May the British commander in Quetta decided to attack the Afghan fortress at Spin Baldak, capturing it (the last time the British Army used an escalade) and, in the process, seized the initiative in the south; however, the situation in the centre of the war zone, around Kurram, remained desperate for the British. The Afghan forces in this area were under the command of General Nadir Khan and he possessed a force of some 14 battalions. Against this, the British at Thal, under Brigadier General Alexander Eustace, possessed only four battalions. To make matters worse, the only troops protecting the upper Tochi Valley were the disaffected North Waziristan Militia. Concerned that they would rise up against him if left to their own devices, Eustace gave the order to abandon the militia outposts, but in doing so, precipitated the desertion of many of the militiamen. This disaffection spread and the South Waziristan Militia in Wana turned on their officers and any men who had remained loyal and attacked them. The survivors, under Major Russell, the commandant, were forced to fight their way out to a column of the North Zhob Militia which had been sent out to relieve them.

Seeing that the situation was deteriorating for the British and seeing an opportunity, Nadir Khan decided to attack Thal. As the Frontier Constabulary had abandoned their posts, on the night of 28/29 May the Afghans were able to occupy a tower  from the fort and from there they were able to set fire to a number of food dumps. This made the situation in the fort dire, as the supply situation had already been low. Other factors also stacked up against the British. Eustace's force was outnumbered and outgunned. He possessed no regular British infantry and his four battalions were inexperienced Indian units, consisting mainly of young recruits. After repelling an infantry assault on 29 May, the following day the garrison was subjected to a heavy bombardment from Afghan guns. As a result of this, the British decided to bring the 16th Infantry Division, consisting of the 45th and 46th Infantry Brigades, up to Peshawar from Lahore, for the purpose of advancing on Jalalabad and have it move up to Kurram. While part of the division was detached to defend Kohat, the 45th Infantry Brigade under Brigadier General Reginald Dyer—who had been at the centre of the Amritsar massacre—set out to relieve Eustace's force at Thal. Dyer's force consisted of only one British battalion, the 1st/25th London Regiment, as well as Dogras, Punjabis and Gurkhas, and short of rations and possessing no transport, they were forced to march through intense heat to effect the relief.

Despite the conditions, however, the British and Indian troops under Dyer's command rose to the occasion and covered the last  in under 12 hours and on 1 June they ran into a blocking force of tribesman that barred both the northern and southern approaches to Thal. Dyer attacked both ends with his artillery, while sending his infantry against the southern approach. Unable to withstand the attack, the tribesmen withdrew and as a result the way through to Eustace's garrison was cleared. During the siege, the British suffered 94 casualties, of which eight were killed, four died of wounds and 82 were wounded.

The next day, 2 June, at dawn Dyer's brigade launched an attack on the Afghan regulars that were positioned away to the west of Thal and as this attack went in Nadir Khan sent out an envoy to deliver a message to the brigade commander. The message told Dyer that Amir Amanullah had ordered Nadir Khan to cease hostilities and Nadir Khan asked Dyer to acknowledge that he would honour the request for an armistice that Amanullah had sent to the British Indian government on 31 May. Unaware that this request had been made, and uncertain as to whether the message and request for a cease fire was a ruse on Nadir Khan's part, Dyer decided that he would not take any chances and sent the reply: "My guns will give an immediate reply, but your letter will be forwarded to the Divisional Commander".

After this Dyer continued his attack and as Nadir Khan's force withdrew from the area, Dyer followed them up with cavalry and armoured cars from the 37th Lancers, while the RAF, using machine guns and iron bombs, attacked and dispersed about 400 tribesmen that were in the area and which posed a threat of counterattack.

On 3 June, the Afghan camp at Yusef Khel was seized by two platoons from the 1st/25th London and two troops from the 37th Lancers supported by a section of guns from the 89th Battery, and shortly afterwards the armistice was signed. With this a cease fire came into effect, however, some fighting continued, particularly in Chitral and in North Baluchistan, and it was not until 8 August 1919 that the settlement was finally concluded when the Treaty of Rawalpindi was signed.

Importance of British airpower

Although limited in numbers and quality, airpower proved to be one of the greatest assets that the British possessed during this conflict. Not only did it allow them to extend their reach beyond the border and bomb Kabul, but it also enabled them to harass the retreating enemy and to break up tribesmen as they attempted to form larger groups prior to launching an attack. The ability of the British to project airpower, even small scale raids, had considerable psychological effects. For example, the single-plane raid on the palace which took place on 24 May 1919, although effecting little actual damage, nevertheless greatly impacted the morale of Afghan citizens and contributed to bringing King Amanullah to request an armistice.

Indeed, as a result of the war and the lessons that were learned about the potential of airpower in the region, following the war, the Chief of the Air Staff, Sir Hugh Trenchard, proposed controlling the frontier by air power alone. This plan had proved highly successful in Mesopotamia, Aden and the Transjordan, however, due to the uniqueness of the North-West Frontier and also due to inter-service politics the plan was not accepted until later. In 1937, it was eventually decided that should another war break out with Afghanistan, or in the event of a major tribal uprising, the RAF would take the offensive, while the ground forces would act defensively. During the course of the conflict, British aircraft losses included at least one plane crashed and two shot down.

King Amanullah objected to the British about the air raids on Kabul, citing British condemnation of the German Zeppelin attacks on London. In his letter to the British government he said, "It is a matter of great regret that the throwing of bombs by Zeppelins on London was denounced as a most savage act and the bombardment of places of worship and sacred spots was considered a most abominable operation, while now we see with our own eyes that such operations were a habit which is prevalent amongst all civilized people of the West."

Outcome

Casualties during the conflict amounted to approximately 1,000 Afghans killed in action, while the British and Indian forces lost 236 killed in action. In addition, 615 were wounded, 566 died from cholera, and 334 died as a result of other diseases and accidents. Regardless of casualties, the outcome of the Third Anglo-Afghan War remains contentious. Ostensibly, the result of the conflict was a British tactical victory. This is by virtue of the fact that the British repulsed the Afghan invasion and drove them from Indian territory, while Afghan cities were subjected to attack by Royal Air Force bombers. Nevertheless, the Afghans were ultimately able to secure their strategic political goals in the aftermath of the conflict. Thus the extent of the British tactical victory was limited, and the Afghans also made strategic gains.

The circumstances behind the war were complicated as was the final settlement. In going to war in 1919 against British India, Amir Amanullah's war aims were complicated. Even up against a depleted British Indian Army, a tactical victory was unlikely; however, the war served the dual purpose of deflecting domestic criticism and also offering the opportunity for strategic political gains. As a result of the peace treaty that was negotiated, the British ceased payment of the Afghan subsidy, and thus ended their claim to direct Afghan foreign policy, which had been the quid pro quo of the Emir accepting the subsidy. The British had traditionally wanted Afghanistan as a buffer state between India and the Russian Empire. In 1919, the Russian Civil War was raging and any threat from Russia to India at the time was potential rather than real. Moreover, the British were by far the largest supporters of the White movement in the Russian Civil War with the British contributing more arms to the Whites than all other nations combined. It was assumed in London that if the Whites won the Civil War, a new era in Anglo-Russian relations might possibly open as the victorious Whites might be grateful for British support, rendering the need for a buffer state in Central Asia irrelevant. The British also stopped arms sales from India to Afghanistan. But, as British influence declined, the Afghans were able to gain control of their own foreign affairs and in the aftermath emerged as a fully independent state. The British also made some political gains, most notably the reaffirmation of the Durand Line – which had long been a contentious issue between the two nations – as a border separating Afghanistan from the North-West Frontier, and the undertaking that the Afghans made to stop interference on the British side of the line.

Although the fighting concluded in August 1919, its effects continued to be felt in the region for some time afterwards. The nationalism and disruption that it had sparked stirred up more unrest in the years to come, particularly in Waziristan. The tribesmen, always ready to exploit governmental weakness, whether real or perceived, banded together in the common cause of disorder and unrest. They had become well-armed as a result of the conflict, whence they benefitted greatly from the weapons and ammunition that the Afghans had left behind and from an influx of manpower in large numbers of deserters from the militia that had joined their ranks. With these additions they launched a campaign of resistance against British authority on the North-West Frontier that was to last until the end of the Raj.

Battle honours

British and Indian infantry units that participated in the conflict received the battle honour "Afghanistan 1919". No other battle honours for individual engagements were issued. Additionally, unlike the first two Anglo-Afghan wars where individual campaign ribbons were issued for separate engagements, no campaign medal was struck for this conflict. Instead, participation in this conflict was recognised by a clasp to the India General Service Medal (1908–1935).

The award of the battle honour was made in four separate Army and Governor General's orders. The earliest, Army Order 97/24, granted the honour to 14 British units. Governor General's Order 193/26 made awards to Indian Army Corps. Governor General's Order 1409/26 made awards to Indian States Forces and finally a further Governor General's Order in 1927 made awards to a further three Gurkha regiments.

The Army Order was unusual in that a mistake was made in awarding the Afghanistan 1919 battle honour to The Hampshire Regiment and the 21st Lancers. This was subsequently rectified and the award to these two units was withdrawn.

Pursuant to Army Order 97/24:

 1st King's Dragoon Guards
 1/4th Battalion, Queen's (Royal West Surrey Regiment)
 2nd Battalion, King's (Liverpool Regiment)
 2nd Battalion, Prince Albert's (Somerset Light Infantry)
 1st Battalion, Alexandra, Princess of Wales's Own (Yorkshire Regiment)
 1st Battalion, Duke of Wellington's (West Riding Regiment)
 2/4th Battalion, Border Regiment
 1st Battalion and 2/6th (Cyclist) Battalion, Royal Sussex Regiment
 1st Battalion, Prince of Wales's Volunteers (South Lancashire Regiment)
 1/4th Battalion, Queen's Own (Royal West Kent Regiment)
 2nd Battalion, Prince of Wales's (North Staffordshire Regiment)
 1st Battalion, Durham Light Infantry
 1/25th (County of London) Cyclist Battalion, London Regiment
 1/1st Kent Cyclist Battalion

Pursuant to Governor General's Order 193/26:

 1st Duke of York's Own Skinner's Horse
 2nd Lancers (Gardner's Horse)
 6th Duke of Connaught's Own Lancers (Watson's Horse)
 7th Light Cavalry
 8th King George's Own Light Cavalry
 11th Prince Albert Victor's Own Cavalry (Frontier Force)
 12th Cavalry (Frontier Force)
 13th Duke of Connaught's Own Lancers
 15th Lancers
 16th Light Cavalry
 17th Queen Victoria's Own Poona Horse
 103rd (Peshawar) Pack Battery (Frontier Force) (Howitzer)
 107th (Bengal) Pack Battery (Howitzer)
 108th (Lahore) Pack Battery
 115th (Jhelum) Pack Battery
 Queen Victoria's Own Madras Sappers and Miners
 King George's Own Bengal Sappers and Miners
 Royal Bombay Sappers and Miners
 Burma Sappers and Miners
 1st Madras Pioneers
 2nd Bombay Pioneers
 3rd Sikh Pioneers
 1st Punjab Regiment
 2nd Punjab Regiment
 4th Bombay Grenadiers
 5th Maratha Light Infantry
 6th Rajputana Rifles
 7th Rajput Regiment
 8th Punjab Regiment
 9th Jat Regiment
 10th Baluch Regiment
 11th Sikh Regiment
 12th Frontier Force Regiment
 13th Frontier Force Rifles
 14th Punjab Regiment
 16th Punjab Regiment
 17th Dogra Regiment
 18th Royal Garhwal Rifles
 19th Hyderabad Regiment
 1st King George V's Own Gurkha Rifles
 2nd King Edward VII's Own Gurkha Rifles (The Sirmoor Rifles)
 4th Prince of Wales's Own Gurkha Rifles
 7th Gurkha Rifles
 8th Gurkha Rifles
 9th Gurkha Rifles
 10th Gurkha Rifles

Pursuant to Governor General's Order 1409/26:

 Patiala (Rajindra) Lancers
 Alwar Lancers
 Bhopal (Victoria) Lancers
 No 1 Kashmir Mountain Battery
 No 2 Kashmir Mountain Battery
 Faridkot Sappers
 Sirmoor Sappers
 Tehri Garhwal Sappers
 Malerkotla Sappers
 Jind Infantry
 Nabha Infantry
 1st Patiala Infantry
 1st Kashmir Infantry
 3rd Gwalior Infantry
 Kapurthala Infantry (Jagatjit Regiment)
 Bharatpur Transport Corps
 Gwalior Transport Corps
 Holkar's Transport Corps (Indore)

Pursuant to Governor General's Order 1927:
 3rd Queen Alexandra's Own Gurkha Rifles
 5th Royal Gurkha Rifles (Frontier Force)
 6th Gurkha Rifles

Many of these units did not exist at the time of the war but were formed as part of the reorganisation of the Indian Army in 1922; however, the decision was made to award the battle honour to the successor units of those involved in the war. The honour was not awarded to regiments that had been disbanded, e.g. 11th Gurkha Rifles, and not all units that took part in the war were awarded the battle honour, e.g. 1/5th Battalion, Hampshire Regiment.

See also
 Invasions of Afghanistan
 European influence in Afghanistan
 Military history of the United Kingdom
 Military history of the North-West Frontier
 Afghanistan–India relations
 Afghanistan–Pakistan relations
 Afghanistan–Nepal relations

Notes
Footnotes

Citations

References

Further reading

External links

 Regiments of the Commonwealth & British Empire

 
03
1910s in Afghanistan
Anglo-Afghan War 03
Conflicts in 1919
Anglo-Afghan War 03
Anglo-Afghan War 03
Anglo-Afghan War 03
Anglo-Afghan War 03
Anglo-Afghan War 03
Anglo-Afghan War 03
Anglo-Afghan War 03
1919 in Afghanistan
1919 in British India
History of the Royal Air Force
20th-century military history of the United Kingdom
Afghanistan–United Kingdom military relations